Ringe may refer to:

People
 Don Ringe (born c. 1946), media consultant
 Donald Ringe, linguist
 Ivo Ringe (born 1951), artist
 Philip Theodor Ringe (1824–1882), silversmith
 Vishwanath Rao Ringe (1922–2005), vocalist

Places
 Ringe Municipality, Denmark
 Ringe, Denmark
 Ringe, Germany
 Ringe, Minnesota

See also
 Ring (disambiguation)